is a stable of sumo wrestlers, part of the Isegahama ichimon or group of stables. It was founded by the 43rd yokozuna Yoshibayama as Yoshibayama dōjō while he was still an active wrestler, before changing to its current name in 1960. As of January 2023, the stable had 20 wrestlers, with two of them ranked in the second highest professional division.



History
In August 2004 former jūryō division wrestler Kanechika took over in controversial circumstances from former maegashira Chikubayama, who had been in charge since 1989. Unusually, the new stablemaster was from a different ichimon (Kanechika belonged to Kitanoumi stable, part of the Dewanoumi ichimon, in his days as an active wrestler). Kanechika was able to take control of the stable because he married one of the daughters of the 9th Miyagino's widow, who owned the toshiyori name, which Chikubayama was only borrowing, and was adopted by her as her son. Chikubayama, who had guided future yokozuna Hakuhō to the top division, was able to stay on as a coach in the stable by acquiring the Kumagatani name. However, in December 2010 he regained control of the Miyagino name and stable after Kanechika was disciplined by the Sumo Association for being caught on tape discussing match-fixing.

Miyagino stable missed two tournaments in 2021 due to outbreaks of COVID-19. The stable withdrew from the January tournament after Hakuhō tested positive, and from the September tournament after Hokuseihō and another lower-division wrestler tested positive.

In July 2022 the Sumo Association announced that Magaki-oyakata (Hakuhō) and Miyagino-oyakata (former maegashira Chikubayama) would be exchanging elder-stocks, with Hakuhō becoming the 13th Miyagino and officially becoming the main coach at the stable. In August of the same year, Miyagino stable also changed location for the second time in the past seven years and started to use the building of the former Azumazeki stable.

Recruitments
Under the recommendation of Hakuhō, the stable began to scout promising talents. In 2020, when Hakuhō was not yet the stablemaster, the stable recruited Hokuseihō, a 2 meter tall Mongolian wrestler. As he was raised in Hokkaido from the age of five, Miyagino was allowed to circumvent the Sumo Association's "one foreigner per stable" rule. Hokuseihō won consecutive championships in the second half of 2020 with perfect records in the jonokuchi, jonidan and sandanme divisions. In July 2021, he won the makushita championship and was promoted to jūryō. In July 2022, Hakuhō recruited 23 year-old Kawazoe Keita, a college yokozuna, into Miyagino-beya. Given Kawazoe's university title, he would enter at the rank of makushita 15 as his accomplishments allows him to use the makushita tsukedashi system. On December 1, it was announced that the stable recruited Ochiai Tetsuya, a two time High School Yokozuna. Similarly to Kawazoe, his high school accomplishments allows him to use the makushita tsukedashi system and enter at the rank of makushita 15. After a strong performance in his first professional tournament, Ochiai managed to win the Makushita tournament with a perfect score, securing a promotion to Jūryō, a first for a makushita tsukedashi. Following his achievement, Ochiai became the fourth sekitori in Miyagino stable and the first wrestler to achieve this rank since Hakuhō took charge of the stable.

The stable has strong links to Tottori Jōhoku High School's sumo program, with Ochiai, Hokuseihō and Ishiura all being graduates. Ishiura's father is the coach of the high school team.

Ring name conventions
Many wrestlers at this stable take ring names or shikona that contains the character 鵬 (read: hō), meaning phoenix, in honor of the 69th yokozuna Hakuhō Shō.

Owners
2022–present: 13th Miyagino: Hakuhō (iin, the 69th yokozuna)
2010-2022: 12th Miyagino: Chikubayama (former maegashira 13)
2004-2010: 11th Miyagino: Kanechika (former jūryō)  
1989-2004: 10th Miyagino: Chikubayama (former maegashira 13)  
1977-1989: 9th Miyagino: Hirokawa (former komusubi)  
1960-1977: 8th Miyagino: former Yoshibayama (the 43rd yokozuna)

Notable active wrestlers

Hokuseihō (best rank maegashira)
Ishiura (best rank maegashira)
Enhō (best rank maegashira)
Ochiai (best rank jūryō)

Coaches
Magaki Masakuni (consultant, former maegashira Chikubayama)

Referee
Shikimori Seisuke (Sandanme gyoji, real name Koshi Saikawa)

Usher
Ryūji (makuuchi yobidashi, real name Ryūji Takahashi)

Hairdresser
Tokoshun (5th class tokoyama)

Location and access
2022-current: Tokyo, Sumida Ward, Higashi Komagata 4-6-4 
until 2022: Tokyo, Sumida Ward, Yahiro 2-16-10, 10 minute walk from Hikifune Station on Keisei Oshiage Line

See also
List of sumo stables
List of active sumo wrestlers
List of past sumo wrestlers
Glossary of sumo terms

References

External links
Japan Sumo Association profile

Active sumo stables